Pingyuan was a former province of the People's Republic of China that existed between 1949 and 1952. Its capital was Xinxiang, now in Henan province.

History
Pingyuan Province was established on August 20, 1949, comprising adjoining prefectures in the provinces of Henan and Shandong:

Xinxiang, Henan (along with then-separate urban centre Xinxiang City)
Puyang, Henan
Anyang, Henan (along with then-separate urban centre Anyang City)
Heze, Shandong
Huxi, Shandong
Liaocheng, Shandong

Pan Fusheng was the first Communist Party Chief of the province, and Chao Zhefu was its only governor. In March 1950, a number of peasants and cattle froze to death when transporting grain to government storage in Puyang prefecture. Pan took partial responsibility for the "Puyang Incident" and was demoted to deputy party chief. He was replaced by Wu De.

The province was abolished on November 15, 1952. Its component territories were returned to their original provinces - with the exception of Anyang's Wu'an, Shexian and Linzhang counties, which were transferred to Handan prefecture in Hebei.

Administrative divisions

See also
History of the political divisions of China

References

History of Hebei
History of Henan
History of Shandong
Former provinces of China
States and territories established in 1949
1952 disestablishments in China
1949 establishments in China